Line S2 is a suburban rapid transit line in the Nanjing Metro system which is currently under construction. The initial phase is expected to open in 2027. The line will have passing loops for express and local services with express trains completing travel across the whole line in 30 minutes.

History
Construction on the first phase, an elevated line from Cihu to Dangtu South, started on 30 December 2020.

Opening timetable

Station list

References

Nanjing Metro lines